All Hat is a 2007 Canadian Western comedy film directed by Leonard Farlinger and starring Luke Kirby, Keith Carradine, Noam Jenkins, and Lisa Ray. It was written by Brad Smith, based on his novel of the same name.

Plot
Ray Dokes is fresh out of prison. Returning home to rural Ontario, he discovers the countryside of his youth transformed. Urban development crawls across the pastoral fields like a rash. Determined to stay out of trouble, Ray heads to the farm of his old friend Pete, a Texan cowboy, whose debts are growing faster than his corn.

Sonny Stanton, the heir to a thoroughbred dynasty, is buying the entire concession of farmland to build a golf course. One of the farms he's after belongs to Etta Parr, Ray's old flame. Seems she's the only one brave enough to stand in Sonny's way.

Ray hooks up with Chrissie Nugent, a kick-ass jockey and tries to steer clear of Sonny. When a million-dollar thoroughbred goes missing from the Stanton Stables, Sonny gets desperate and forces the sale of the community's remaining farms. Ray reacts by coming up with a scheme to stop Sonny once and for all. One false move will land Ray back in jail.

Cast
Luke Kirby as Ray Dokes
Stephen McHattie as Earl Stanton
Keith Carradine as Pete Culpepper
Noam Jenkins as Sonny Stanton
Lisa Ray as Etta Parr
Rachael Leigh Cook as Chrissie Nugent
David Alpay as Paulie Stanton
Ernie Hudson as Jackson Jones
Joel Keller as Dean Calder
Graham Greene as Jim Burns
Gary Farmer as Billy Caan
Michelle Nolden as Gena Stanton

Production

All Hat was filmed in several Canadian locations:
Ontario
Fort Erie, Ontario and its racetrack
Hamilton, Ontario

Release and reception

On review aggregator website Rotten Tomatoes, the film has a rating of 20% based on 5 critics, with an average rating of 4.3/10.

The film premiered on September 11, 2007 at the Toronto International Film Festival, and was shown at the Okanagan Film Festival on April 19, 2008. It was released direct-to-DVD in North America on May 27, 2008.

All Hat earned only $15,198 on a budget of $CAD5,000,000.

References

External links

2007 comedy films
2007 films
2000s Western (genre) comedy films
Canadian Western (genre) comedy films
English-language Canadian films
Films based on Canadian novels
Films directed by Leonard Farlinger
Films set in Ontario
Films shot in Ontario
2000s English-language films
2000s Canadian films